is a female Japanese yaoi manga artist born in the Fukushima Prefecture.  She is known for the young appearance of her bishounen character designs and for her "extreme" sex scenes.  Her debut work was "Strawberry Children".
Haruka Minami is also known by her debut name Kazuka Minami (南 かずか Minami Kazuka) and she is the author of many erotic yaoi manga, including My Paranoid Next Door Neighbor and Flowered Virgin Soil. As of lately, she seems to prefer writing under Haruka Minami over Kazuka Minami. She is a notable seller of doujinshi at Comiket under the names "MECCA" and "Panis AngeLics", which comes from a misspelling of panis angelicus.

Minami also provides illustrations for BL novels.

She was to be a guest at Yaoi-Con 2009, but had to pull out due to ill health.

Works
 Strawberry Children
 Forbidden Sweet Fruit
 Immoral Love Sickness
 Koibito Shigan
 My Paranoid Next Door Neighbor
 Love a la Carte! (Central Park Media, now published by Animate USA)
 Hanairo Virgin Soil

Works (plus some under the name Minami Haruka)
Aisaretatte Nugimasen.
Anata no Tsubomi o Osewa Shimasu!
Bitter - Kare no Hisoyaka na Seppun
Child Epicurean
Dannasama to Mitsugetsuchuu
Digimon Adventure 02 dj - Porcelain
Digimon Adventure 02 dj - Prime
Egotist na Seishokusha
Furachi na Kare no Shitsukekata
Gundam Wing dj - Baby Pink
Gundam Wing dj - Crystallize
Gundam Wing dj - Marmalade Kiss
Gundam Wing dj - Monopolize
Gundam Wing dj - Porcelain
Haitoku no Love Sick
Hanairo Virgin Soil
Honey Boys Spiral
Hyper Eroticism Fanbook
J-BOY by Biblos
Junk! Boys
Kiken na Hokeni Counselor
Kimi de Oboreta Ato wa
Kindan no Amai Kajitsu
Kiri no Gakuen Series
Kohitsuji Hokaku Keikaku!
Koibito Shigan
Love Cure
Love Healing
Love Kitchen
Love Material
Love Pet
Love Rental
Love Sweat
Making Love Like Newlyweds
Masochist Warning
Mayoeru Shomin Ai no Te o
Momo Mimi Pheromone
Nijou na Koi no Kakehiki
No Toy
Osananajimi Kussetsuritsu
Pink Lace na Kare
Renai à la Carte!
S-ka Chuuihou!
Saihate no Kimi e
Sailor Moon dj - Colorful Moon 8 shorts
Sailor Moon dj - Crystal Planet H&M
Sailor Moon dj - Sky Fish, Sea Bird
Senzoku de Aishite
Sexy Aroma Night
Skin Cream de Nurashite
Strawberry Children
Strip
Sweet - Kare no Amai Amai Aji
Sweet Erogenous
Sweet Meats
Tonari no Heya no Paranoia
Yuri Hime Wildrose
Zetsuai Bronze dj - Daisuki! 2
Zetsuai Bronze dj - Sasayakana Yuuwaku

References

External links

Women manga artists
Japanese female comics artists
Living people
Female comics writers
Manga artists from Fukushima Prefecture
Japanese women writers
Japanese writers
Year of birth missing (living people)